Lee Hye-young (

 Elaine Vermeulen (actress, born 1979)
 971)